Louis Wehrmann Building, also known as the John and Amy Mintrup House, is a historic commercial building located at Washington, Franklin County, Missouri. It was built about 1857, and is a -story, five bay, German Neoclassical style brick building in the Klassisismus form.  It features a two-story neoclassical pilasters and an ornamental ironwork balcony over the central front door.

It was listed on the National Register of Historic Places in 2000.

References

Commercial buildings on the National Register of Historic Places in Missouri
Neoclassical architecture in Missouri
Commercial buildings completed in 1857
Buildings and structures in Franklin County, Missouri
National Register of Historic Places in Franklin County, Missouri
1857 establishments in Missouri